LGBT in Poland may refer to:
LGBT history in Poland
LGBT rights in Poland
:Category:Polish LGBT people